Welcome to Wikipedia,
the free encyclopedia that anyone can edit.
 articles in English

{{#ifexpr:>150|From today's featured article|Featured article (Check back later for today's.)}}
{{#ifexpr:>150||}}
Did you know ...
In the news

On this day

Other areas of Wikipedia

Wikipedia's sister projects

Wikipedia languages